The Toyota Land Cruiser (J40),  is a series of Land Cruisers made by Toyota from 1960 until 2001. Traditional body on frame, most 40 series Land Cruisers were built as 2-door models with slightly larger dimensions than the similar Jeep CJ.

The model was available in short (J40/41/42), medium (J43/44/46) and long (J45/47) wheelbase versions, with petrol and diesel engines.

History
For the history of the J series from the original 1951 Toyota Jeep BJ through the J20 series see Land Cruiser History from 1950 to 1955.
 1960: J40 series launched (wheelbase //).
 1963: Longer wheelbase, FJ45-B, pickup and cab-chassis were added).
 1967: End of four-door FJ45V (I) ( WB) production, replaced by FJ55 Station wagon).
 2-door FJ45-B renamed FJ45 (II) ( WB).
 1968: 40-series production commences as the Bandeirante in Brazil, with locally produced Mercedes-Benz diesel engine.

 1972: HJ45 launched with the H, 3.6-litre inline 6-cylinder diesel engine.
 1974: BJ40/43 launched with the B, 3.0-litre inline 4-cylinder diesel engine.  A factory-fitted roll bar becomes standard in the United States (FJ40).
 1975: Rear barn doors are added to US model FJ40s. The lift gate remains available as an option in other countries.
 1976: Disc brakes on the front axle.
 1977: Front door vent windows removed, added rear vent windows on the hard top in the United States
 1979: Power steering (only F models) and air conditioning added to the options, gear ratios modified from 4.11 to 3.70 in the United States to be more freeway friendly. 1979 and later FJ40s square grill bezels. 
 1980: HJ47 launched with a 4.0-liter six-cylinder diesel engine. End of HJ45 production.
 BJ42/46 and BJ45 launched with a 3.4-liter four-cylinder diesel engine.
 1981: Power steering added on the BJ models to the options, disc brakes added in Australia.
 1984: End of J40 series production in most markets (replaced by J70 series). Continued as the Bandeirante in Brazil.
 1993: Five-speed transmission becomes available for the Toyota Bandeirante.
 1994: In Brazil, the Mercedes-Benz OM-364 engine is replaced by the Toyota 14B unit.
 2001: End of Bandeirante production.

Models

The J40/41/42 was a two-door short wheelbase four-wheel-drive vehicle, with either a soft or a hardtop (V). It was available with various petrol or diesel (from 1974) engines over its lifetime. It was replaced on most markets from 1984 by the J70 series (70/71).
 The FJ42 is 4X2 model, for only The Middle East.
The J43/J44/46 was an extremely rare two-door medium wheelbase four-wheel-drive vehicle, with either a soft or a hard-top (V). It was replaced on most markets from 1984 by the J70 series (73/74).
The J45/47 was a long-wheelbase four-wheel-drive vehicle, available in two-door hardtop, three-door hardtop, four-door station wagon and two-door pickup models. The four-door station wagon model (FJ45V-I) was the shortest-lived of the J40 series, as it was replaced by the FJ55G/V in 1967.
The Bandeirante TB25/TB41/TB51 Series are J25 series Land Cruisers built in Brazil by Toyota do Brasil Ltda from 1962 to 1968. In 1966 they were replaced by the OJ32 (soft top) and OJ31 (hard top) for the TB25, and the TB81 for the TB51; for an unknown reason the TB41 would keep its J2 code until 1968 when Toyota do Brasil switched to the J40 series.
The second generation Bandeirante OJ40/OJ45 Series (1968 to 1973), OJ50/OJ55 Series (1973 to 1994) and BJ50/BJ55 Series (1994 to 2001) are J40 series cars built in Brazil by Toyota do Brasil Ltda from 1968 to 2001. Identical to the BJ40 in almost every respect, it had a few stylistic modifications to the grille (models produced from 1989 on featured square headlights, instead of the round ones used before) and used Mercedes-Benz OM-314/OM-324/OM-364 diesel engines (replaced by Toyota 14B inline 4 direct injection Diesel engine in 1994) for much of its production life; another visible major characteristic are the entire hind doors (like in Land Rover SUVs) rather than the traditional Toyota two-wing hind doors at the Bandeirante's hard top models.

The Bandeirante Models

 1968:
OJ40L - Short soft top bushdrive car - motor Mercedes-Benz OM-324 (September 1968 to January/February 1973) - replaces the OJ32L
OJ40LV - Short hard top bushdrive car - motor Mercedes-Benz OM-324 (October 1968 to January/February 1973) - replaces the OJ31L
OJ40LV-B - Long hard top bushdrive car - motor Mercedes-Benz OM-324 (October 1968 to January/February 1973) - replaces the TB41L
OJ45LP-B - Short pickup with native bed - motor Mercedes-Benz OM-324 (September 1968 to January/February 1973) - replaces the TB81L
 1973: 
OJ50L - Short soft top bushdrive car - motor Mercedes-Benz OM-314 (February 1973 to November 1989) - replaces the OJ40L
OJ50LV - Short hard top bushdrive car - motor Mercedes-Benz OM-314 (February 1973 to November 1989) - replaces the OJ40LV
OJ50LV-B - Long hard top bushdrive car - motor Mercedes-Benz OM-314 (February 1973 to November 1989) - replaces the OJ40LV-B
OJ55LP-B - Short pickup with native bed - motor Mercedes-Benz OM-314 (February 1973 to November 1989) - replaces the OJ45LP-B
 between 1973 and 1989: 
OJ55LP-B3 - Short chassis-cab pickup - motor Mercedes-Benz OM-314 (19?? to November 1989) - new in 19??
OJ55LP-BL - Long pickup with native bed - motor Mercedes-Benz OM-314 (19?? to November 1989) - new in 19??
OJ55LP-BL3 - Short chassis-cab pickup - motor Mercedes-Benz OM-314 (19?? to November 1989) - new in 19??
OJ55LP-2BL - Long 2-door double cabin pickup with native bed - motor Mercedes-Benz OM-314 (19?? to November 1989) - new in 19??
 1989: 
OJ50L - Short soft top bushdrive car - motor Mercedes-Benz OM-364 (November 1989 to April 1994) - replaces the OJ50L with Mercedes-Benz OM-314 motor
OJ50LV - Short hard top bushdrive car - motor Mercedes-Benz OM-364 (November 1989 to April 1994) - replaces the OJ50LV with Mercedes-Benz OM-314 motor
OJ50LV-B - Long hard top bushdrive car - motor Mercedes-Benz OM-364 (November 1989 to April 1994) - replaces the OJ50LV-B with Mercedes-Benz OM-314 motor
OJ55LP-B - Short pickup with native bed - motor Mercedes-Benz OM-364 (November 1989 to April 1994) - replaces the OJ55LP-B with Mercedes-Benz OM-314 motor
OJ55LP-B3 - Short chassis-cab pickup - motor Mercedes-Benz OM-364 (November 1989 to April 1994) - replaces the OJ55LP-B3 with Mercedes-Benz OM-314 motor
OJ55LP-BL - Long pickup with native bed - motor Mercedes-Benz OM-364 (November 1989 to April 1994) - replaces the OJ55LP-BL with Mercedes-Benz OM-314 motor
OJ55LP-BL3 - Long chassis-cab pickup - motor Mercedes-Benz OM-364 (November 1989 to April 1994) - replaces the OJ55LP-BL3 with Mercedes-Benz OM-314 motor
OJ55LP-2BL - Long 2-door double cabin pickup with native bed - motor Mercedes-Benz OM-364 (November 1989 to April 1994) - replaces the OJ55LP-2BL with Mercedes-Benz OM-314 motor
 1994: 
BJ50L - Short soft top bushdrive car - motor Toyota 14B - April 1994 to November 2001 - replaces the OJ50L
BJ50LV - Short hard top bushdrive car - motor Toyota 14B - April 1994 to November 2001 - replaces the OJ50LV
BJ50LV-B - Long hard top bushdrive car - motor Toyota 14B - April 1994 to November 2001 - replaces the OJ50LV-B
BJ55LP-B - Short pickup with native bed - motor Toyota 14B - April 1994 to November 2001 - replaces the OJ55LP-B
BJ55LP-B3 - Short chassis-cab pickup - motor Toyota 14B - April 1994 to November 2001 - replaces the OJ55LP-B3
BJ55LP-BL - Long pickup with native bed - motor Toyota 14B - April 1994 to November 2001 - replaces the OJ55LP-BL
BJ55LP-BL3 - Long chassis-cab pickup - motor Toyota 14B - April 1994 to November 2001 - replaces the OJ55LP-BL3
BJ55LP-2BL - Long 2-door double cabin pickup with native bed - motor Toyota 14B - April 1994 to November 2001 - replaces the OJ55LP-2BL
 1999: 
BJ55LP-2BL4 - Long 2-door double cabin pickup with native bed - motor Toyota 14B - 1999 to November 2001 - new in 1999

Engines
The J40 series was produced with both diesel and petrol engines. The F series was a 6-cylinder petrol motor, B series a 4-cylinder diesel, and H series a 6-cylinder diesel.  The diesel trucks were never sold to the general public in the United States, though some found their way in as mine trucks.  Some engines are similar within their series; for example, the F and 2F engines share many of the same parts. However the H and 2H designations have almost nothing in common. 

Engines included (power and torque figures may vary depending on the market):

Features
A pair of jump seats folded behind the front seats, maximizing cargo space compared to the full width folding rear seat of the Jeep CJ series.
Original factory optional winches were  P.T.O. driven. Later models were electric powered.

Legacy

Toyota still offers many replacement parts for the J40, available through Toyota parts departments worldwide.

In 2006, Toyota introduced the FJ Cruiser, a modern SUV with styling paying homage to the J40 Land Cruiser. The FJ Cruiser (FJC) went on sale in the spring of 2006.

In Brazil

In Brazil, the J40 was known as the Toyota Bandeirante, and made from 1968 until 2001. The previous generation built in Brazil from 1958 to 1962 received the series code FJ25 (open roof) and FJ25L (soft top) but are often referred to as FJ-251, and in 1961 thanks to a new motor called 2F - not to be confounded with the later 2F engine from 1975 - there still came out some few units with the series code FJ-151L (soft top). But the Bandeirantes built from 1968 to 1993 - with Mercedes-Benz engines - received OJ40/45 (OJ50/55 from 1973) series chassis codes and those built from 1994 to 2001 - with Toyota engines - have BJ50/55 series model codes.

References

Further reading

40
All-wheel-drive vehicles
Compact sport utility vehicles
Pickup trucks
Cars introduced in 1960
1970s cars
1980s cars
1990s cars
2000s cars